The 2011–12 División de Honor B began on October 2, 2011 and finished on February 19, 2012 with the Final.

Competition format
The regular season runs through 14 matchdays. Upon completion the regular season, the two top teams of each group play a promotion playoff consisting of semifinal and final. The two semifinal winners are directly promoted. The two semifinalists defeated play a final tie with the winner being earning the last spot in División de Honor. Teams in 7th & 8th position play the relegation playoff to Primera Nacional.

Each win means 4 points to winning team.
A draw means 2 points for each team.
1 bonus point for a team that achieves 4 tries in a match.
A defeat by 7 or less points means 1 bonus point for defeated team.

2011–12 season teams

Group A
Teams from northern part of Spain

Final standings

Source: Federación Española de Rugby

Group B
Teams from southern part of Spain

Final standings

Source: Federación Española de Rugby

Promotion playoffs

Polideportivos & Fitness CRC and Complutense Cisneros; promoted to División de Honor.
Hernani play the relegation/promotion playoff versus Sanitas Alcobendas.

Scorers statistics

By try points

By total points

See also
 División de Honor B de Rugby
 División de Honor de Rugby
 Rugby union in Spain

References

External links
Past seasons at ferugby.com

2011
B